Mrtvice is a village east of Drnovo in the Municipality of Krško in eastern Slovenia. The area is part of the traditional region of Lower Carniola. It is now included with the rest of the municipality in the Lower Sava Statistical Region.

Mass grave
Mrtvice is the site of a mass grave associated with the Second World War. It contains the remains of over 100 civilians and Croatian soldiers.

Cultural heritage
A number of Roman graves have been found in the area, indicating the eastern extent of the necropolis of the nearby Roman town of Neviodunum.

There is a small open chapel-shrine in the settlement. It was built in 1926.

References

External links
Mrtvice on Geopedia

Populated places in the Municipality of Krško